Michael Finlay Robinson (born 3 March 1933) is an English composer, musicologist, and academic. His scholarly work focuses on opera of the 17th and 18th centuries; and in particular the development of Italian opera during the 1700s. His publications include the books Naples and Neapolitan Opera (Oxford University Press, 1972), Opera Before Mozart (Hutchinson, 1966), and A Thematic Catalogue of the Works of Giovanni Paisiello (Pendragon, vol 1. published in 1991 and vol. 2 in 1994). He also contributed to several collaborative works, including Research Chronicle of the Royal Musical Association (1972), The New Grove Dictionary of Music and Musicians (1980) and Opera buffa in Mozart's Vienna (Cambridge University Press, 1997), and to several music journals like Music & Letters and Soundings.

Robinson was born in Gloucester.  He earned Bachelor of Arts, Bachelor of Music, Master of Arts, and Doctor of Philosophy degrees from New College, Oxford. In October 2009 he obtained the Oxford Doctor of Music degree by examination. He began his teaching career at the Royal Scottish Academy of Music and Drama in 1960-1961 where he was a lecturer in the subjects of harmony and counterpoint. He has since served on the music faculties of Durham University (1961–1965), McGill University, and Cardiff University. In 1989 he was a visiting professor at the University of Naples. Upon his retirement in 1994 he was named a professor emeritus of Cardiff University.

Music compositions
Sonata Movement for viola d'amore and pianoforte (originally 1960; later rearranged for viola and pianoforte)
A Child's Vision of Night for soprano and pianoforte (1964)
Six Fugues for harpsichord (1967–68)
Credo and Gloria for 4-pt choir and organ (1968)
String Quartet No 1 (1972)
String Quartet No 2 (1974)
Three Settings of Thomas Hardy for baritone and pianoforte (1975)
Duo for Violin and Pianoforte (1975)
Three Settings of W.B. Yeats for tenor and pianoforte (1979)
Duo for Two Pianos (1982–83)
A Pretty How Town (words by E.E. Cummings) for baritone and eight instrumentalists (1984)
Phoenix for oboe and pianoforte (1988, revised 1993)
Three Songs about Love for baritone and pianoforte (1985–94)
Two Songs for Cherry Willingham for children's voices and pianoforte (1994–96)
Fantasy for Solo Violoncello (1997)
Blessed Art Thou, O God, anthem for unaccompanied 8-pt choir (2001)
The House of Bernarda Alba, opera in 2 acts (1997–2004)
A Welsh Garland, suite for wind band (2005–06)
The Bells of Leud for pianoforte solo (2007)
Four Sonnets for soprano and pianoforte (2008)

References

1933 births
Living people
Academics of Cardiff University
Academics of Durham University
Alumni of New College, Oxford
English classical composers
English musicologists
Academic staff of McGill University
English opera composers
Male opera composers
People from Gloucester
Academics of the Royal Conservatoire of Scotland
Musicians from Gloucestershire
English male classical composers